Dodecyl gallate, or lauryl gallate, is the ester of dodecanol and gallic acid.  As a food additive it is used under the E number E312 as an antioxidant and preservative.

References

Food antioxidants
Carboxylate esters
E-number additives